KHVL (1490 AM) is a radio station, paired with two FM relay translators. Licensed to Huntsville, Texas, 1490 KHVL & 104.9 K285GE primarily serve Huntsville and the surrounding Walker County rural areas. 94.1 K231DA relays KHVL's programming to extend the signal into Willis, Panorama Village, and Lake Conroe. The station's branding is The Lake and broadcasts a classic hits format.

Translators

History
KHVL was granted its License to Cover by the Federal Communications Commission on November 1, 1938 as 1500 kHz KSAM @ 0.1 kilowatt daytime only. The facility was initially owned by the Sam Houston Broadcasting Association, H.G. Webster, President.

On April 14, 2022, KHVL changed its branding from "The Hits" to "The Lake", positioning as "More Music, More Fun" featuring a rock leaning classic hits playlist from the 1970s to the 1990s with more music from the 1990s coming.

References

External links

HVL
Classic hits radio stations in the United States